New Zealand political leader Jack Marshall assembled a "shadow cabinet" within the National Party caucus after his change to the position of Leader of the Opposition in 1972. He composed this of individuals who acted for the party as spokespeople in assigned roles while he was Leader of the Opposition (1972–74). As the National Party formed the largest party not in government at the time, the frontbench team was as a result the Official Opposition within the New Zealand House of Representatives.

Marshall made the choice to not separate the shadow cabinet from the rest of the caucus to foster party unity. Likewise he made the choice to highlight both National's experience and stability by making minimal changes to his lineup from February 1972. He did not allocate portfolios held by defeated MP Duncan MacIntyre (Maori Affairs, Lands and Environment) or retired MP Lorrie Pickering (Education). Defeated MP Hugh Templeton continued as a member and the secretary of the National caucus, he was given membership by virtue of his new role as Marshall's executive assistant.

Frontbench team
The list below contains a list of Marshall's shadow ministers and their respective roles.

Notes

References

New Zealand National Party
Muldoon, Robert
1972 establishments in New Zealand
1974 disestablishments in New Zealand